James Patrick Lavelle (18 January 1896 – 16 July 1952) was an Australian rules footballer who played with Essendon in the Victorian Football League (VFL).

Notes

External links 
		

1896 births
1952 deaths
Australian rules footballers from Victoria (Australia)
Essendon Football Club players